Ancylosis ormuzdella is a species of snout moth in the genus Ancylosis. It was described by Hans Georg Amsel in 1954, and is known from Shiraz, Iran.

References

Moths described in 1954
ormuzdella
Moths of Asia